= French ship Belle =

Eight French ships of the French Navy have borne the name Belle:

- A 6-gun frigate (1668)
- A galley (1669)
- A captured Spanish frigate (1676)
- A barque (1678)
- A galley (1679)
- A barque (1684)
- A galley (1688)
- A barque (1691)
